The Indian Football Association, abbreviated as IFA, is the organisation that administers association football in the Indian state of West Bengal. It is the oldest Football Association in India and was founded in 1893. Among the founders was former English international Elphinstone Jackson.

It organises tournaments such as the Calcutta Football League, the Calcutta Women's Football League and the IFA Shield. From 2021, the IFA also took an initiative to start its own futsal league.

History
Contrary to the name, the association does not administer the game in India, a task that falls to the All India Football Federation (AIFF), instead governs the game in the state of West Bengal. However, before the formation of the AIFF, the IFA was in de facto control of football in India by virtue of its administration by Englishmen as well as its affiliation to the Football Association. Hence, all foreign tours were conducted by the IFA and also foreign teams negotiated with the IFA for visits to India. In its formative years, the only Indian representative in the English dominated executive committee was Kalicharan Mitra from the Sovabazar Club. By vigorously promoting the game in Bengal, the IFA became undivided India's premier football body in the early decades of the 20th century.

Through the efforts of Nagendra Prasad Sarbadhikari (the father of Indian football), A.R. Brown and B.C. Lindsay of Dalhousie AC, and Watson of Calcutta FC, the IFA was established in 1893. A.R. Brown was the first Secretary of the IFA. Norman Prichard, the first Indian to win an Olympic medal, was the Secretary of the IFA in 1900.The most remarkable person to head the IFA was the Maharaja of Santosh, Sir M.N. Roy Chowdhury. During his tenure the IFA played an instrumental role in the formation of the AIFF.

The IFA had organised many historical tournaments like the Trades Cup, the Gladstone Cup, the Cooch Behar Cup and the coveted IFA Shield, prior to the incorporation of Calcutta Football League in 1898. The Trades Cup is the oldest tournament in Kolkata, being instituted in 1889.

Clubs outside Bengal complained about the lack of neutrality in the affairs of the IFA. This disillusionment of clubs and patrons led to the formation of associations such as the Western India Football Association, which preferred to be governed by themselves rather than by the IFA. After years of numerous conferences and meetings, the IFA along with other five regional football associations broke their mutual deadlock to form the AIFF in 1937.

Competitions

Men's
 Calcutta Football League 
 IFA Shield
 Trades Cup
 Uttarbanga Cup
 Jayanta Chatterjee Inter District Football Tournament
 IFA Futsal Championship

Women's
 Calcutta Women's Football League

Youth 
 CFL 5th Division Group B

Corporate structure

See also
 Football in India
 Football in Kolkata
 IFA Shield
 Calcutta Premier Division
 West Bengal football team
 List of football clubs in Kolkata

References

Further reading

Dutta, P. L., Memoir of 'Father of Indian Football' Nagendraprasad Sarbadhikary (Calcutta: N. P. Sarbadhikary Memorial Committee, 1944) (hereafter Memoir)
Ghosh, Saurindra Kumar. Krira Samrat Nagendraprasad Sarbadhikary 1869–1940 (Calcutta: N. P. Sarbadhikary Memorial Committee, 1963) (hereafter Krira Samrat).
Roselli, John. Self Image of Effeteness: Physical Education and Nationalism in Nineteenth Century Bengal. Past & Present (journal). 86 (February 1980). p. 121–48.
Sinha, Mrinalini. Colonial Masculinity, The Manly Englishman and the Effeminate Bengali in the Late Nineteenth Century (Manchester: Manchester University Press, 1995).
Chatterjee, Partha. The Nation and Its Fragments: Colonial and Post-colonial Histories (Calcutta: Oxford University Press, 1995).
Mason, Football on the Maidan, p. 144; Dimeo, Football and Politics in Bengal, p. 62.

From recreation to competition: Early history of Indian football . pp. 124–141. Published online: 6 Aug 2006. www.tandfonline.com. Retrieved 30 June 2021.

External links
IFA Official Site
IFA page on AIFF Website
IFA Official YouTube Channel

Football governing bodies in India
Sports organizations established in 1893
Football in West Bengal
Organisations based in Kolkata
1893 establishments in British India